Martin Edward Williams (born March 5, 1951) is a Republican politician who served in the Senate of Virginia from 1996 to 2008.

Early life and career
Williams was born in Virginia on March 5, 1951.

Political career
Williams served on the Newport News City Council for six years and was twice elected Vice-Mayor by his peers.  In 1995, Williams challenged long-term Senator Hunter Andrews in the 1st Senate District and defeated him.  In 2007, Williams was challenged in the Republican Primary and was defeated by conservative local activist Patricia "Tricia" Stall.  Stall went on to lose her election to Democrat John Miller.

References

1951 births
Living people
Republican Party Virginia state senators
Politicians from Newport News, Virginia
Virginia city council members